The following is the qualification system and qualified athletes, countries and teams for the Archery at the 2023 Central American and Caribbean Games competitions.

Qualification system 
A total of 116 archers will qualify to compete at the games (58 per gender). A country may enter a maximum of twelve archers (six per gender). As host nation, El Salvador qualifies twelve athletes automatically. Two qualification tournaments were used to determine the 104 qualifiers, in recurve and compound.

Recurve 
A country may enter a maximum of three recurve athletes per gender (for a maximum of six total). As host, San Salvador automatically receives one quota per gender team. At the first qualification tournament, the top four teams in the team event qualify, along with three individuals per gender and one individual places for the next four NOC in ranking. At the second qualification tournament, the top two teams along with three individuals will qualify per gender and one individual places for the next three NOC in ranking. If a country that won an individual quota(s) at the first tournament, wins a team quota at the second tournament, those individual spots will be reallocated to the second qualification individual event.

Compound 
A country may enter a maximum of three compound athletes per gender (for a maximum of six total). As host, San Salvador automatically receives one quota per gender team. At the first qualification tournament, the top four teams in the team event qualify, along with three individuals per gender and one individual places for the next four NOC in ranking. At the second qualification tournament, the top two teams along with three individuals will qualify per gender and one individual places for the next three NOC in ranking. If a country that won an individual quota(s) at the first tournament, wins a team quota at the second tournament, those individual spots will be reallocated to the second qualification individual event.

Qualification timeline

Qualification summary

Recurve men

Recurve women

Compound men

Compound women

References

P
Qualification for the 2023 Central American and Caribbean Games
Archery at the 2023 Central American and Caribbean Games